Bucculatrix ulmifoliae is a moth in the family Bucculatricidae. It was described by Erich Martin Hering in 1931. It is found in Great Britain, the Netherlands, Germany, central and eastern Europe. It has also been recorded from Iran.

The wingspan is 6–7 mm. The ground colour of the forewings is whitish buff, suffused with reddish brown toward the base. The hindwings are ochreous grey. Adults are on wing from April to May and again in July in two generations per year.

The larvae feed on Ulmus glabra, Ulmus laevis and Ulmus minor. They mine the leaves of their host plant. The mine starts as a contorted gallery, filled with black frass. The mine continues as a straight corridor which is almost completely filled with frass. Older larvae live freely at the leaf underside, causing window feeding. Larvae can be found in July and from September to October. They are transparent yellowish. The species overwinters in the pupal stage.

References

External links
 

Bucculatricidae
Leaf miners
Moths described in 1931
Moths of Asia
Moths of Europe
Taxa named by Erich Martin Hering